Atatürk's Address To The Youth of Turkey is a famous speech by the Republic of Turkey's first president, founding father, and national hero, Mustafa Kemal Atatürk, spoken as the concluding statements to his 36-hour 20 October 1927 address to the Parliament, wherein he laid out, in a sweeping and thoroughly-detailed retrospective, the history and intellectual foundations of the Turkish War of Independence and the fight for modernity, liberty and democracy that fueled the Turkish Revolution, and ultimately led to the October 29, 1923 establishment of the Republic of Turkey.
 
The speech is a direct address to the present and future younger generations of the country, and functions as a call to vigilance in the face of difficulties that may face the nation, as well as a reminder of the civic and patriotic duty of each citizen to protect their freedoms in the face of internal and external adversaries.

A framed version of the speech typically occupies the wall above the blackboard in the classrooms of Turkish schools, accompanied by a Turkish flag, a photograph of the country's founding father Atatürk, and a copy of the national anthem.

Atatürk's Address To Turkish Youth  

Turkish Youth!

Your first duty is forever to preserve and to defend Turkish
Independence and the Turkish Republic.

This is the very foundation of your existence and your future. This
foundation is your most precious treasure. In the future, too, there may be
malevolent people at home and abroad who will wish to deprive you of this
treasure. If someday you are compelled to defend your independence and your
republic, you must not tarry to weigh the possibilities and circumstances of
the situation before taking up your duty. These possibilities and
circumstances may turn out to be extremely unfavourable. The enemies
conspiring against your independence and your republic may have behind them
a victory unprecedented in the annals of the world. It may be that, by
violence and ruse, all the fortresses of your beloved fatherland may be
captured, all its shipyards occupied, all its armies dispersed and every
part of the country invaded. And sadder and graver than all these
circumstances, those who hold power within the country may be in error,
misguided, and may even be traitors. Furthermore, they may identify their
personal interests with the political designs of the invaders. The country
may be impoverished, ruined, and exhausted.

Youth of Turkey's future,

Even in such circumstances, it is your duty to save the Turkish Independence 
and Republic.

You will find the strength you need in your noble blood.

Gazi Mustafa Kemal Atatürk, 27 October 1927.

References

Turkish culture
1927 in Turkey
1927 speeches